Edesio Alejandro Rodríguez Salva (born March 28, 1958) is a Cuban composer of electronic music. He has composed music for theatre plays, TV, and movies; as well as several concert compositions. Many of them experimental, using synthesizers and mixing together actors, dancers, and musicians in unusual line-ups (1).

His rock opera Violente, of 1987, is considered the first rock opera in Latin America (1). His band, active since 1988, has an eclectic and innovative sound, using Cuban styles such as rumba and conga in fusion with foreign genres such as rap, funk, soul, and hip-hop (1).

Edesio Alejandro has played in South America, Canada, and Europe. His albums Orisha Dreams and Black Angel were among the first 100 of World Music in Europe in 1999. Blen Blen, from the CD Black Angel, was first place for several weeks in the MTV Europe Dance Floor Charts (1).

In 2010 was nominated to Latin Grammy and in 2011 to American Grammy for the production 100 sones cubanos.

Among his work, are noteworthy his collaborations with director Fernando Pérez.

In 2013 he was accepted as a member of the Academy of Arts and Cinematographic Sciences of Spain

Filmography

1983
 El desastre del Barcástegui. (Doc.).
1987
 Clandestinos. Dir. Fernando Pérez.
1988
 Una más entre ellos. (Doc.). Dir. Rebeca Chávez.
 Entre leyendas. (Doc.). Dir. Rebeca Chávez.
 Octubre del 67. (Doc.). Dir. Rebeca Chávez.
 El desayuno más caro del mundo. (Doc.). Dir. Gerardo Chijona.
1989
 Dribleando. (Dibujo Animado). Dir. Mario García-Montes.
 El caballito de los dos nombres. (Dibujo Animado). Dir. Mario García-Montes.
 El alfabeto. (Dibujo Animado). Dir. Tulio Raggi.
 Dibújame un cordero. (Doc.).
 La vida en rosa. (con Manuel Eugenio). Dir. Rolando Díaz.
1990
 Detrás del espejo. (CM.).
 El hombre y su aventura. (Doc.).
 Caravana. Dir. Rogelio París y Julio C. Rodríguez.
 Hello Hemingway. (LM. Ficc.). Dir. Fernando Pérez.
 La crin de Venus. Dir. Diego Rodríguez Arché.
1991
 Adorables mentiras. (LM. Ficc.). Dir. Gerardo Chijona.
 El amor se acaba. (CM.).
1992
 El triángulo. (CM.). Dir. Rebeca Chávez.
 La bobocracia. (Dibujo Animado). Dir. Elisa Rivas.
1993
 Sosa Bravo en dos tiempos. (Doc.).
 Solo nosotros los dinosaurios. (CM.).
 El largo viaje de Rústico. (Doc.). Dir. Rolando Díaz.
1995
 Madagascar. (Ficc.). Dir. Fernando Pérez.
 De Fresa y Chocolate a Guantanamera. (Doc.). Dir. Rebeca Chávez.
 Del otro lado del cristal. (Doc.). Dir. Guillermo Centeno.
1996
 Blue Moon. Dir. Fernando Timossi D..
 El Sardinas. (CM.). Dir. Manuel A. Rodríguez.
1997
 Kleines Tropikana. (LM. Ficc.). Dir. Daniel Díaz.
 Historia en África. (Doc.). Dir. Rebeca Chávez.
 Patinando La Habana. (Doc.). Dir. Jorge Luis Sánchez.
1998
 La vida es silbar. (LM. Ficc.). Dir. Fernando Pérez.
1999
 Como los dioses. (Doc.). Dir. Lázaro Buría.
2000
 Hacerse el sueco. (con Gerardo García). Dir. Daniel Díaz.
 Algo más que el mar de una esperanza. (Doc.). Dir. Francisco Andino.
2001
 Nada. (LM. Ficc.). Dir. Juan Carlos Cremata.
2002
 Suite Habana. (LM. Ficc.). Dir. Fernando Pérez.
2003
 Viviendo al límite. (Doc.). Dir. Belkis Vega.
 Perfecto amor equivocado. (LM. Ficc.). Dir. Gerardo Chijona.
2004
 Bailando Cha Cha Cha. (con Ernesto Cisneros). Dir. Manuel Herrera.
 Tres veces dos. (Cuento: Lila). Dir. Lester Hamlet.
2005
 Un Rey en La Habana. (LM. Ficc.). Dir. Alexis Valdés.
2007
 Madrigal. Dir. Fernando Pérez.
2008
 Kangamba.Dir. Rogelio Paris.
2009
 Marti el ojo del canariol. Dir. Fernando Pérez.
2010
 Boleto al paraiso. (LM. Ficc.). Dir. Gerardo Chijona.

References
 Edesio Alejandro bio at CubaCine.cu, retrieved on June 12, 2008.

Cuban film score composers
1958 births
Living people